Jean Ethel Burns (14 December 1919 – 25 May 2019) was an Australian aviatrix. She was the first Australian woman to parachute from an aeroplane over Australia and held the title of being the youngest female pilot in Australia for 15 years.

Early life
Burns was born at Rathdowne Street in the inner Melbourne suburb of East Brunswick. Her father was a merchant seaman. She attended MacRobertson Girls' High School, Albert Park, Victoria, Australia.

Career

Flying
Burns said she was inspired to fly at age 10 when she visited Essendon Aerodrome, seeing Yorkshirewoman Amy Johnson fly in shortly after having completed the first solo flight by a woman from England to Australia in May 1930.

At the age of 14, Jean joined the Junior Royal Victorian Aero Club and started flying lessons at the age of 17. Graduating with two other young women on 13 March 1937, she obtained her A class pilot's licence and became Australia's youngest female pilot.  She held the record until Brigid Holmes broke it as a younger 17-year-old in 1952.

She flew an Ansett Porterfield (Model 35 or Collegiate) with her parachute instructor Mr Felix B Mueller from Melbourne to District Park Aerodrome for the Newcastle Air Display on 19 February 1938.

Parachuting
She was 17 years old and watched by an audience of somewhere between two and five thousand. The aircraft belonged to Aerat Passenger Flying (Essendon) Pty Ltd and was piloted by Howard Morris Snr. She was reported to have fallen on landing and to have suffered facial abrasions from being dragged along the ground by her parachute. Reports did not mention whether her harness was equipped with quick disconnects to avoid such injury. She was carried away by ambulancemen though not seriously injured.

Burns had planned to actually descend at the age of 16, however the Civil Aviation Department were skeptical at that time, so she waited 18 months before permission was granted on the condition that her parachute be folded by a licence holder.

Her second jump involved another untidy landing and was followed by a letter of warning from officials claiming the jumps were in breach of the law though she would not be prosecuted.

Ambulancemen again came to her aid on her fifth jump, in Newcastle, New South Wales, on 20 February 1938, when winds took her off course resulting in a landing at A Goninan & Co after avoiding two sets of high-tension electricity cables.

'Until I am down to about  there is a beautiful floating sensation, and then suddenly the ground seems to rush up and meet me. Some parachutists can land on their feet, but usually I take a fall. 'In the air you can lose height more rapidly by pulling a handful of cords which causes the 'chute to sideslip. There are four red cords which you can pull on the ground to spill the air out so you are not dragged too far.' Mr. Felix Mueller, a licensed parachutist, instructed Miss Burns, and supervised the folding of her parachute, which is a very important item – a twisted cord or a wrong fold of silk would probably mean tragedy." She was also quoted as saying she had taken up jumping to raise funds to buy an aeroplane.

Burns only made about a dozen jumps over a period of little over a year.

Later life and death

For the first time, on 21 July 2006, Burns managed to meet Nancy Bird Walton, a fellow aviator and pioneer. They had known each other for most of their lives but never met before.

Burns died on 25 May 2019 after a short illness. She was 99.

Street naming at Essendon Airport

In October 2008, Burns Street at Essendon Airport was named in honour of her. The street is located within Essendon Fields.

References

Further reading
 Girl Parachutist Comes Back to Earth-and Work -The Argus 23 November 1937
 Girl's Second Descent – The Argus 29 November 1937
 
 Australian Parachute Federation: History of Australian Parachuting from 1958
 Website by Greg Weir

1919 births
2019 deaths
Australian aviation record holders
Aviators from Melbourne
Australian women aviators
Women aviation record holders
People educated at Mac.Robertson Girls' High School
People from Brunswick, Victoria